École Le Mascaret (French for Le Mascaret School) is a middle school located in Eastern Moncton. Le Mascaret shares the same building as École L'Odyssée, a public francophone high school.
Le Mascaret accommodates 575 students from grades 6 to 8. The new complex replaced the old Vanier and Beauséjour schools, which were shut down in 2005.

Le Mascaret is anticipated to move locations in 2021 to offer more space from the overpopulated school École L'Odyssée.

See also
 Francophone Sud School District
 List of schools in New Brunswick

References

External links
 
 Official opening for Le Mascaret and L'Odyssée Schools in Moncton (05/09/30)

Middle schools in Moncton
Educational institutions established in 2005
2005 establishments in New Brunswick